William Jeffrey Austin (born July 5, 1951) is a former professional tennis player from the United States.

Tennis career
Austin, an All-American on four occasions, played tennis for the UCLA Bruins and was a member of their 1970 and 1971 NCAA Championship winning teams.

He made the third round at the 1973 Wimbledon Championships, where he lost to Szabolcs Baranyi, despite winning the first two sets.

In 1973, he won both the singles and doubles titles at the Aptos Open. In 1974, Austin, along with his sister Pam, was a member of the World Team Tennis champion Denver Racquets.

Personal life
Austin's sister is two-time US Open champion Tracy Austin and he is also the brother of Doug, John and Pam Austin, all tennis players.

He married fitness instructor Denise Katnich on April 30, 1983. They have two daughters.

Career after tennis
Austin now works as a sports agent. He is head of the basketball division at the Octagon.

Grand Prix career finals

Singles: 1 (1–0)

Doubles: 2 (1–1)

References

External links
 
 

1951 births
Living people
Tennis players from Boston
American male tennis players
UCLA Bruins men's tennis players
Tennis people from California
American sports agents